Justin Castellaro (born 7 September 1990) is an Italy international rugby league footballer who plays for the Northern Pride in the Intrust Super Cup.

Background
Castellaro was born in Ingham, Queensland, Australia. He is of Italian descent.

Castellaro played his junior rugby league for the Herbert River Crushers.

Playing career
In 2012, Castellaro joined the Northern Pride from the Herbert River Crushers, being named vice-captain of their Intrust Super Cup side in 2017. In 2016, he represented Italy in the 2017 Rugby League World Cup qualifiers. He played three games, scoring three tries, which included two against Russia in the European play-off game. In 2017, he was named in Italy's 2017 Rugby League World Cup squad.

References

1990 births
Living people
Australian rugby league players
Australian people of Italian descent
Italy national rugby league team players
Northern Pride RLFC players
Rugby league centres
Rugby league wingers
Rugby league players from Queensland